Inal Valikoyevich Tasoev (born 5 February 1998) is a Russian judoka.

He participated at the 2018 World Judo Championships, winning a medal.

In 2021, he won the silver medal in his event at the Judo World Masters held in Doha, Qatar.

References

External links
 

1998 births
Living people
Russian male judoka
Judoka at the 2019 European Games
European Games medalists in judo
European Games gold medalists for Russia
European Games silver medalists for Russia
21st-century Russian people